Number One Christmas is a studio album by American country artist Jeannie Seely. It was first released in 1994 on Power Pak Records. It was co-produced by Moe Lytle and Tommy Hill. Her twelfth studio recording, Number One Christmas was also Seely's first album of holiday music to be released.

The album was later reissued on Gusto Records in 2007 where it was re-titled as A Golden Christmas. The newer version remain unchanged with the exception of two new album tracks.

Background, content and release
Number One Christmas was recorded in 1994 in sessions produced by Moe Lytle and Tommy Hill. Seely had worked with both producers on a prior album project with Jack Greene in 1982 in which they re-recorded their former hits. In its original release, the album consisted of eight tracks. All tracks were cover versions of traditional holiday recordings. Among these recordings was "God Rest Ye Merry Gentlemen", "What Child Is This?" and "Silent Night". The original album was released on Power Pak Records in 1994 as both a CD and cassette.

The album was re-released on October 7, 2007, on Gusto Records and was issued in a digital format. It was also re-titled A Golden Christmas. The re-release included the same material, as well as two new track that were added. The song, "Up on the Housetop", was featured and included featured instrumentation from a group called the Nashville Fiddles. A second new recording was included on the re-release, "Little Drummer Boy". The track featured instrumentation from a group called the Nashville Banjos. In addition, the album included new cover art that had not been previously released.

Track listing

Number One Christmas track listing

A Golden Christmas track listing

Personnel
All credits are adapted from the liner notes of Number One Christmas.

 Tommy Hill – producer
 Moe Lytle – producer
 Jeannie Seely – lead vocals
 Chuck Young – art direction and liner notes

Release history

References

1994 Christmas albums
Christmas albums by American artists
Country Christmas albums
Jeannie Seely albums